Santa (=Saint) Maria Domenica Mazzarello may refer to:

 Saint Maria Domenica Mazzarello, Italian founder of the Salesian Sisters
 Santa Maria Domenica Mazzarello titular church, in Rome, dedicated to her, for cardinal-priest